The following elections are scheduled to occur in 2022. The National Democratic Institute also maintains a calendar of elections around the world.

 2022 United Nations Security Council election
 2022 national electoral calendar
 2022 local electoral calendar

Africa 
2022 Gambian parliamentary election 9 April 2022
 2022 Republic of the Congo parliamentary election 10 July 2022
 2022 Senegalese parliamentary election 31 July 2022
 2022 Kenyan general election 9 August 2022
 2022 Angolan general election 24 August 2022
 2022 São Toméan legislative election 25 September 2022
 2022 Lesotho general election 7 October 2022
 2022 Equatorial Guinean general election 20 November 2022
 2022 Tunisian parliamentary election 17 December 2022

Americas
 2022 Barbadian general election 19 January 2022
 2022 Costa Rican general election 6 February and 3 April 2022
 Colombia
 2022 Colombian parliamentary election 13 March 2022
 2022 Colombian presidential election 29 May 2022
Canada
 43rd Ontario general election 2 June 2022
 43rd Quebec general election 3 October 2022
2022 Grenadian general election 23 June 2022
2022 Saint Kitts and Nevis general election 5 August 2022
 2022 Brazilian general election 2 October and 30 October 2022
 2022 United States elections 8 November 2022
 2022 Dominican general election 6 December 2022

Asia
 2022 elections in India
 2022 South Korean presidential election 9 March 2022
 Malaysia
 2022 Johor state election 12 March 2022
 2022 Malaysian general election 19 November 2022
 2022 Turkmenistan presidential election 12 March 2022
 2022 East Timorese presidential election 19 April 2022
 Philippine general election
 2022 Philippine presidential election 9 May 2022
 2022 Philippine Senate election 9 May 2022
 2022 Philippine House of Representatives elections 9 May 2022
 2022 Lebanese general election 15 May 2022
 2022 Japanese House of Councillors election 10 July 2022
 2022 Kuwaiti general election 29 September 2022
 2022 Israeli legislative election 1 November 2022
 2022 Bahraini general election 12 November 2022
 2022 Kazakh presidential election 20 November 2022
 2022 Nepalese general election 20 November 2022
 2022 Taiwanese local elections 26 November 2022

Europe

 2022 Portuguese legislative election 30 January 2022
Spain
2022 Castilian-Leonese regional election 13 February 2022
 2022 Andalusian regional election 19 June 2022
 2022 Maltese parliamentary election 26 March 2022
Germany
 2022 Saarland state election 27 March 2022
 2022 Schleswig-Holstein state election 8 May 2022
 2022 North Rhine Westphalia state election 15 May 2022
 2022 Lower Saxony state election 9 October 2022
 2022 Hungarian parliamentary election 3 April 2022
 2022 Serbian general election 3 April 2022
France
2022 French presidential election 10 and 24 April 2022
2022 French legislative election 12 and 19 June 2022
Slovenia
 2022 Slovenian parliamentary election 24 April 2022
 2022 Slovenian presidential election 23 October 2022 
 2022 Northern Ireland Assembly election 5 May 2022
 2022 Swedish general election 11 September 2022
 Czech Republic
 2022 Czech Senate election 23–24 September, 30 September–1 October 2022
 2022 Czech municipal elections, 23–24 September
 Italy
 2022 Italian general election 25 September 2022
2022 Sicilian regional election 25 September 2022
 2022 Latvian parliamentary election 1 October 2022
 2022 Bosnian general election 2 October 2022
 2022 Bulgarian parliamentary election 2 October 2022
 2022 Austrian presidential election 9 October 2022
 Slovakia
 2022 Slovak local elections 29 October 2022
 2022 Slovak regional elections 29 October 2022
2022 Danish general election 1 November 2022

Oceania
Australia
 2022 South Australian state election 19 March 2022
 2022 Australian federal election 21 May 2022
 2022 Victorian state election 26 November 2022
2022 Papua New Guinean general election 4–22 July 2022
2022 New Zealand local elections 16 September-8 October 2022
2022 Nauruan parliamentary election 24 September 2022
2022 Vanuatuan general election 13 October 2022
2022 Fijian general election 14 December 2022

References

 
2022
Elections
2020s elections